Ringside may refer to:

Sports
Ringside of a boxing ring
Ringside of a wrestling ring
Ringside seating (combat sports), see Ringside (boxing)

Film
Ringside Maisie, 1941 boxing film
Ringside (1949 film), American boxing drama film
Ringside (2016 film), TV One boxing drama with Tyler Lepley and Julissa Bermudez
Ringside, 1960 Swedish boxing documentary with Bengt Feldreich

Television
Ringside (2005 TV series), with Brian Kenny (sportscaster)
Ringside (ESPN TV series), weekly boxing series on ESPN Classic
Ringside, on Solar Sports from List of Philippine television shows
Sky Ringside, the "Ringside" Australian pay-per-view channel by Sky

Music
Ringside (band), indie rock band from Hollywood, California
 Ringside (Ringside album), 2005
Ringside (Cold Chisel album), 2003
Ringside - Cold Chisel the Movie, 2003 DVD by Cold Chisel
Ringside, 1997 album by Ron Affif
Ringside, mixtape from Smoke DZA discography
Ringside - Live at Lorensbergsteatern, Göteborg, video album by Jerry Williams (singer) 2008

Other
Ringside, collection of boxing stories by Budd Schulberg
RingSide Steakhouse, restaurant in Portland
Ringside, a minigame in the video game Rhythm Heaven Fever

See also

 
 
 Ringside seat (disambiguation)